Dongsheng Subdistrict is a subdistrict in and the seat of Shuangliu District, Chengdu, Sichuan, People's Republic of China, situated in the immediate vicinity of Chengdu Shuangliu International Airport. , it has 20 residential communities (社区) under its administration.

See also 
 List of township-level divisions of Sichuan

References 

Geography of Chengdu
Township-level divisions of Sichuan
Subdistricts of the People's Republic of China